Epimelitta is a genus of beetles in the family Cerambycidae, containing the following species:

 Epimelitta acutipennis Fisher, 1947
 Epimelitta aglaia (Newman, 1840)
 Epimelitta barbicrus (Kirby, 1818)
 Epimelitta bicolor (Bates, 1873)
 Epimelitta bleuzeni Penaherrera-Leiva & Tavakilian, 2003
 Epimelitta consobrina Melzer, 1931
 Epimelitta debilis (Gounelle, 1911)
 Epimelitta durantoni Penaherrera-Leiva & Tavakilian, 2003
 Epimelitta eupheme (Lameere, 1884)
 Epimelitta euphrosyne (Newman, 1840)
 Epimelitta laticornis (Klug, 1825)
 Epimelitta lestradei Penaherrera-Leiva & Tavakilian, 2003
 Epimelitta longipennis Zajciw, 1963
 Epimelitta manni (Fisher, 1930)
 Epimelitta melanaria (Gounelle, 1911)
 Epimelitta meliponica Bates, 1870
 Epimelitta mimica (Bates, 1873)
 Epimelitta mneme (Newman, 1841)
 Epimelitta nigerrima (Bates, 1892)
 Epimelitta ornaticollis (Zajciw, 1973)
 Epimelitta postimelina Giesbert, 1996
 Epimelitta rufiventris Bates, 1870
 Epimelitta scoparia (Klug, 1825)
 Epimelitta triangularis Fuchs, 1961
 Epimelitta viridimicans Fisher, 1952

References

 
Rhinotragini